Daniel E. Lieberman (born June 3, 1964) is a paleoanthropologist at Harvard University, where he is the Edwin M Lerner II Professor of Biological Sciences, and Professor in the Department of Human Evolutionary Biology. He is best known for his research on the evolution of the human head and the human body.

Biography 
Lieberman was educated at Harvard University, where he got his B.A., M.A. and Ph.D. degrees. He also received a M. Phil from Cambridge University. He was a Junior Fellow in the Harvard Society of Fellows and taught at Rutgers University and the George Washington University before becoming a professor at Harvard University in 2001.

Director of the Skeletal Biology Laboratory at Harvard, Lieberman is on the curatorial board of the Peabody Museum of Archaeology and Ethnology, a member of the Department of Organismic and Evolutionary Biology at Harvard, and the Scientific Executive Committee of the L.S.B. Leakey Foundation.

Honors and awards
 National Merit Scholar, 1982
 Phi Beta Kappa (Harvard College), 1986
 Summa cum laude, Harvard College
 Frank Knox III Memorial Fellowship, 1986-1987
 National Science Foundation Graduate Fellowship, 1987-1990
 Junior Fellowship, Harvard Society of Fellows, 1993-1996 
 Ig Nobel Prize in Physics, 2009
 Everett Mendelsohn Excellence in Mentoring Award, Harvard University, 2009
 Harvard College Professorship, 2010-2015
 American Academy of Arts and Sciences, 2020

Research 
Lieberman studies how and why the human body is the way it is, with a primary focus on the evolution of physical activity  His research combines paleontology, anatomy, physiology and experimental biomechanics in the lab and in the field. In his career, he initially focused to a large extent on why and how humans have such unusual heads. Since 2004 most of his research has focused on the evolution of human locomotion including whether the first hominins were bipeds, why bipedalism evolved, the biomechanical challenges of pregnancy in females, how locomotion affects skeletal function and, most especially, the evolution of running. His 2004 paper with Dennis Bramble, “Endurance Running and the Evolution of the Genus Homo” proposed that humans evolved to run long distances to scavenge and hunt. His research on running in general, especially barefoot running was popularized in Chris McDougall's best-selling book Born to Run. Lieberman is an avid marathon runner, often barefoot, which has earned him the nickname 'The Barefoot Professor'.

Bibliography

Books
Lieberman, Daniel (2011). The Evolution of the Human Head. Harvard University Press. ISBN 978-0-674-04636

Critical studies and reviews of Lieberman's work
 Review of The story of the human body.

References 

Living people
Harvard University faculty
Harvard University alumni
1964 births
Harvard Fellows
Rutgers University faculty
George Washington University faculty
Alumni of the University of Cambridge